Vanessa: Her Love Story is a 1935 American romantic drama film directed by William K. Howard, starring Robert Montgomery, Helen Hayes, and May Robson. Distributed by Metro-Goldwyn-Mayer, it was based on the 1933 novel Vanessa by Hugh Walpole. The film premiered on 1 March 1935.

Cast

Robert Montgomery as Benjamin Herries
Helen Hayes as Vanessa Paris
May Robson as Madame Judith Paris
Otto Kruger as Ellis Herries
Lewis Stone as Adam Paris
Henry Stephenson as Barney Newmark
Violet Kemble Cooper as Lady Herries
Donald Crisp as George
Agnes Anderson as Marion
Lionel Belmore as Will Leathwaite
George K. Arthur as Porter
Jessie Ralph as Lady Mullion
Lawrence Grant as Amery Herries
Crauford Kent as Timothy
Howard Leeds as Jamie
Mary Gordon as Mrs. Leathwaite
Ethel Griffies as Winifred Trent
Elspeth Dudgeon as Vera Trent

References

External links

 
 

1935 films
1935 romantic drama films
American black-and-white films
American romantic drama films
Films based on British novels
Films directed by William K. Howard
Films scored by Herbert Stothart
Films set in England
Films set in the 1880s
Metro-Goldwyn-Mayer films
1930s English-language films
1930s American films